The House of Volcasso or Volcassio was a Ragusan noble family.

History 
They are mentioned since the 13th century, and were one of the wealthiest families in the 14th century. It was extinct by 1372.

Notable members 
Volcasso di Giovanni ( 1265), settled Ragusa.
Pasqua de Bolchasso ( 1293), Ragusan diplomat in Venice.
Pasque de Volcasso ( 1302).
Zugno de Volchasso ( 1303).
Goysclaua de Volcasso ( 1304), wife of Paolo Querini.
Junius de Volcax ( 1313).
Junius de Volcasso ( 1319).
Junii de Volcasso ( 1340).
Laurizza de Volcasso ( 1343–44).
Matchi de Volcasso ( 1363).
Laurentius de Volcasso/de Volcasio/Lorenzo de Volcaxo ( 1352–59), rector.
Marini de Volchasso.
Clementis de Vulchasso
Vincenzo Volcasso.

Annotations
Also spelt Volchasso, Bolchasso, Volcassio, Volcasio, Vulchasso, Volcax, Volcaxo. The name was derived from Slavic Vlkas, Vlkasović (Vukasović).

References

Sources

Ragusan noble families